The 74th Indian Infantry Brigade was an infantry brigade formation of the Indian Army during World War II. It was formed in July 1942, in India. The brigade was assigned to the 25th Indian Infantry Division and fought in the Burma Campaign.

Formation
8th Battalion, 19th Hyderabad Regiment August 1942 to  September 1943
14th Battalion, 10th Baluch Regiment August 1942 to August 1945
6th Battalion, Oxfordshire and Buckinghamshire Light Infantry August 1942 to June 1945
3rd Battalion, 2nd Gurkha Rifles October 1943 to August 1945	
9th Battalion, Royal Sussex Regiment July to August 1945

See also

 List of Indian Army Brigades in World War II

References

British Indian Army brigades
Military units and formations in Burma in World War II